Lloyd Vernon "Skip" Martin (May 14, 1916, in Robinson, Illinois – February 12, 1976, in Los Angeles, California) was an American jazz saxophonist, clarinetist, and music arranger.

Background

Martin was active principally as an arranger for some of the most popular swing jazz bands of the 1930s and 1940s. He worked with Count Basie, Charlie Barnet (1939–40), Benny Goodman (1941), and Glenn Miller (1941–42); doubling as a reedist with the last three. In the Goodman orchestra he played alto sax alongside Gus Bivona and recorded with the legendary trumpeter Cootie Williams in the early 1940s as well.

Later in the 1940s he worked with Les Brown (memorably the big-band chart for I've Got My Love to Keep Me Warm), then moved to Los Angeles in the 1950s, where he did extensive work as a staff and freelance orchestrator, studio conductor (e.g. Astaire's Royal Wedding, 1951) and popular song arranger (often for Tony Martin, The Pied Pipers, the Andrews and De Castro sister groups, or Barbara Ruick).

Martin also recorded three albums as a leader and produced material for West Coast jazz and swing concept albums (e.g. 1959's Scheherajazz with Gus Bivona) for Somerset Records. In 1963 he joined Nelson Riddle on a dream team of arrangers working on the Sinatra-Burke compilation albums for the ambitious Reprise Musical Repertory Theatre project, featuring the singing members of the Rat Pack, plus Bing Crosby, Rosemary Clooney and Jo Stafford.

In Hollywood, Martin was one of the team of orchestrators contributing to Singin' in the Rain (1952) and Guys and Dolls (1955). He frequently shared arrangement credits with Conrad Salinger, such as on Summer Stock (1950), Kiss Me Kate (1953) and Funny Face (1957). He was the sole credited orchestrator for Judy Garland's comeback vehicle A Star Is Born (1954), which contains many arrangements by him of Harold Arlen and Ira Gershwin ballads, principally "The Man that Got Away" and "It's a New World".

References
Barry Kernfeld, "Skip Martin". Grove Jazz online.
 The Internet Movie Database
Billboard (magazine)
Grudens, Richard, Chattanooga Choo Choo: The Life and Times of the World Famous Glenn Miller Orchestra, Celebrity Profiles Publishing, 2004, pp. 126–127.

External links
 

Scheherajazz Live World Premiere Fall/Winter 2016
Scheherajazz Features Music Ensembles - Eastern Washington University

1916 births
1976 deaths
American jazz clarinetists
American jazz saxophonists
American male saxophonists
American music arrangers
People from Robinson, Illinois
RCA Victor artists
20th-century American saxophonists
Jazz musicians from Illinois
20th-century American male musicians
American male jazz musicians
Glenn Miller Orchestra members
Shortridge High School alumni